Shane William Archbold (born 2 February 1989) is a New Zealand professional racing cyclist who currently rides for UCI WorldTeam .

Career
Born in Timaru, Archbold competed in the men's omnium at the 2012 Summer Olympics, and won the gold medal in the men's scratch race at the 2014 Commonwealth Games, along with bronze in the men's team pursuit.

He was named in the start list for the 2016 Tour de France. During the 2016 Tour de France Shane crashed early on in the 17th stage and broke his pelvis but he struggled on to finish the stage. However, he was forced to withdraw from the race four days from the finish. In October 2017 it was announced that Archbold would join  for the 2018 season.

In August 2018, he was without a professional road team because Aqua Blue Sport folded. He decided to team up with Aaron Gate to return to track cycling and participated in Six Day London and Six Day Melbourne of 2018–19 Six Day Series with the eye of entering madison event in 2020 Tokyo Olympics. In August 2019, he was named in the startlist for the 2019 Vuelta a España.

Major results

2005
 1st  Time trial, National Novice Road Championships
2006
 2nd  Team pursuit, UCI Junior Track World Championships
2007
 National Junior Track Championships
1st  Individual pursuit
1st  Points race
 Australian Youth Olympic Festival
1st  Points race
3rd  Individual pursuit
 1st Stage 4 Tour du Pays de Vaud
2008
 1st Stage 4 Tour de Vineyards
2011
 1st Stage 4 Mi-Août en Bretagne
 2nd  Omnium, UCI Track World Championships
 10th Overall Rás Tailteann
2013
 1st Six Days of Fiorenzuola (with Dylan Kennett)
 1st Stage 2 Rás Tailteann
2014
 Commonwealth Games
1st  Scratch
3rd  Team pursuit
 2nd Omnium, Fenioux Piste International
 9th Rutland–Melton CiCLE Classic
2015
 2nd Classica Corsica
 3rd Grand Prix d'Isbergues
 5th Omloop van het Houtland
 8th Rund um Köln
2017
 7th Coppa Bernocchi
2018
 6th Road race, Commonwealth Games
 7th Grand Prix de Denain
2019
 1st Stage 2 Czech Cycling Tour
2020
 1st  Road race, National Road Championships
 3rd Overall Okolo Slovenska
2021
 9th Grote Prijs Marcel Kint
2022
 National Road Championships
1st  Criterium 
8th Road race

Grand Tour general classification results timeline

References

External links

1989 births
Living people
New Zealand male cyclists
New Zealand track cyclists
Cyclists at the 2012 Summer Olympics
Olympic cyclists of New Zealand
Cyclists at the 2010 Commonwealth Games
Cyclists at the 2014 Commonwealth Games
Commonwealth Games gold medallists for New Zealand
Commonwealth Games bronze medallists for New Zealand
Commonwealth Games medallists in cycling
People from Timaru
20th-century New Zealand people
21st-century New Zealand people
Medallists at the 2014 Commonwealth Games